The 1908–09 Tennessee Volunteers basketball team represents the University of Tennessee during the 1908–09 college men's basketball season. The Volunteers team captain was Nathan Dougherty.

Schedule

|-

References

Tennessee Volunteers basketball seasons
Tennessee
Tennessee Volunteers
Tennessee Volunteers